Samragyee Rajya Laxmi Shah (born 18 November 1995), credited as Samragyee RL Shah, is a Nepali film actress who works in Nepali cinema. Shah is the recipient of several awards, including one NFDC National Film Awards and one NEFTA Film Awards.

She has starred in numerous Nepali films, including A Mero Hajur 2 (2017), Intu Mintu Londonma (2018), and Rato Tika Nidharma (2019). Shah debuted as an actress in the 2016 romantic drama Dreams, which went on to become a commercial success, and earned several awards for her performance. After being cast in Ashok Sharma's directorial project Rato Tika Nidharma (2019) and paid 1.6 million Nepalese rupees (NPR), Shah became the highest-paid actress in the Nepali film industry. She is also related to the Nepali royal family. Her upcoming movie is Timro Mero Saath, which also marks directorial debut of Ramesh MKPoudel.

Early life and personal life 
Shah was born on 18 November 1995 in Birgunj, Nepal, to Neha Rajya Laxmi Shah and Mahesh Bikram Shah. Samragyee RL Shah is related to the Nepali royal family through her grandfather Pashupati Bikram Shah. According to Anand Nepal of Nepali Actress: 

Shah attended St. Xavier's Higher Secondary School in Birgunj, Nepal, from grades one to three. She continued her studies in Sai Baba School in New Delhi, India. After completing sixth grade, she attended the Royal Academy of India in Kathmandu.

Shah has dated Devanksh SJB Rana since 2018. In 2017 Shah was included in the list of "Top 10 Women and Men of the Year" published by weekly publication Kantipur Saptahik, sister publication of Kantipur, where she was ranked in tenth position.

Career

2014: Modelling 
In 2014, Shah was the second runner-up in the Face of Classic Diamond Jewellers fashion competition, receiving a NPR 25,000 cash prize. Nepali model Asmi Shrestha won the event, and Nepali actress and model Paramita RL Rana was the first runner-up. After the competition, Shah was featured on the cover of the M&S VMAG magazine and was also interviewed, in which she revealed her desire to become a model, and said that she felt increased self-esteem and "more beautiful and confident as a person". According to Shah, the fashion competition boosted her popularity and recognition, helped her hone her skills as a model, raised her confidence, and made her "realise that there is still so much to learn as a model", which encouraged her "to work hard every day."

2016–2017: Film debut and commercial success 
In 2016, Shah debuted as a film actress in Bhuwan K.C.'s romantic drama Dreams, where she starred alongside Anmol K.C. and Sandhya K.C. In the film, Shah played Kavya, the love interest of Aveer. Her performance received mixed responses from critics. The Himalayan Times observed, "Anmol and Shah fall short in their acting. From their dialogue delivery to acting, they are not natural, especially in serious scenes. [...] Shah's acting is acceptable when she is herself in casual composure, but when emotions kick in she is odd." In an interview, Shah revealed that she was selected out of 26 girls to star in the film. The film became a box office success, earning NPR 17.0 million in its first two days of release and NPR 50 million in its first week. In an interview with MovieMandu, the film's producer Bhuwan K.C. stated, "From her first debut movie she has been able to win the heart of 3 core Nepali [people]". Subsequently, Shah won the Best Debut Actor award from the Dcine Awards, Kamana Film Awards, NFDC National Film Awards, and NEFTA Film Awards.

In 2017, Shah played the lead role in Jharana Thapa's directorial debut film, A Mero Hajur 2. Shah starred alongside Salon Basnet and Salin Man Bania in his acting debut. In the film, she played Maya, who falls in love with someone who had a crush on her when she was younger. The film set a record for the highest single-day box office in Nepal, grossing NPR 16.2 million. Sandhya Ghimire of OnlineKhabar wrote, "The movie keeps the audience laughing as we relate to the foolish things we have had done to gain the attention of our crushes in school. As the story unfolds, we are taken on a train ride back to good old school days and a multitude of wavelets of nostalgia wash over us." Shah's performance led to her to be nominated for her second National Film Award.

2018 

In 2018, Shah appeared in four Nepali films, including Mangalam, Timi Sanga, Kaira, and Intu Mintu Londonma. In Mangalam, she made a cameo appearance as a psychiatrist. In Shishir Rana's Timi Sanga, Shah appeared in the lead role as a Non Resident Nepali (NRN). While the film was criticised for its stereotypical representation of the LGBTIQ community, Shah's performance was praised by critics. Shashwat Pant of OnlineKhabar wrote, "Fan favorite Samragyee Shah looks to be in her zone playing the role of an NRN. Acting as the lead in her third film, she has come a long way since her debut movie Dreams. Her attitude stands out in the film along with her acting in some of the emotional scenes".

In Kaira, Shah appeared in the lead role alongside actor Aaryan Sigdel. The film was commercially unsuccessful—earning only NPR 9.6 million on its second day—and received mixed reviews from critics. Shah's performance was praised by critics. According to OnlineKhabar, "One good thing that stands out in the movie is the acting. It shows how much the actors have worked on getting their role right. Shah is good and so is as  Kaira. Her acting is good, especially in the emotional scenes where she's poised and natural. [The reviewer] didn't think she Samragyee had it in her to play such an emotional role."

In Intu Mintu Londonma, the directorial debut of choreographer Renasha Bantawa Rai, Shah played the role of Mintu, who unknowingly falls for her friend Intu. Shah's performance received mixed responses from critics. Shashwat Pant of OnlineKhabar wrote, "Samragyee Shah who always plays the same type of roles offers nothing new in this film too. But she fits well in the film and has acted well. Her emotional scenes are getting better with each movie she plays." Aditya Neupane of República wrote, "The picture quality, venue selection, and the set and wardrobe designs are comparatively superior to the current mainstream Nepali movies. But lags in the story department." The film became a huge box office success, collecting NPR 20 million on its second day. On 30 March 2018, Shah received the Star of the Year award at the FAAN Awards. She was awarded alongside fellow actor Pradeep Khadka by the current Prime Minister of Nepal, KP Sharma Oli.

2019 
In 2019, Shah worked on Maruni, starring alongside Puspa Khadka and Rebika Gurung. On 11 June 2019, the film released its title track, Jaam Na Maya Jaam, which featured Shah and Pushpa Khadkha. The film was released on 30 August 2019, alongside of Indian action thriller Saaho. Film critics praised Shah for her different role in Maruni. Maruni failed to impress audience, and the box office.

After Ashok Sharma announced his next directorial project, Rato Tika Nidharma, Shah received NPR 1.6 million for her role, making her the highest-paid actress in Nepali cinema. Shah appeared alongside Neeta Dhungana and Ankit Sharma in his acting debut. Previously, actress Jassita Gurung was considered for the role, but Gurung left the project for unpublished reasons after Shah replaced her lead role in the film. Rato Tika Nidharma is set to release on 27 September 2019, on occasion Dashain, the Hindu festival of Nepal. The film failed at box office, where it earned est. NPR 7 million. Sunny Mahat of The Annapurna Express criticised Shah's performance for not being able to speak Nepali language properly.

Filmography

Accolades

References

External links 

 
 

1995 births
Living people
21st-century Nepalese actresses
Nepalese female models
Nepalese film actresses
Thakuri
People from Birgunj
21st-century Nepalese nobility
20th-century Nepalese nobility
Nepalese Hindus